Petrovo-Dalneye is a rural locality (a selo) in Krasnogorsky District of Moscow Oblast. Nikita Khrushchev lived here in a six-room house after his ouster from power in 1964.

Rural localities in Moscow Oblast
Krasnogorsky District, Moscow Oblast